Akita Northern Bullets are a Japanese rugby union team that play in the Top East League. The team is based in Akita, Akita, Japan. In 1958, the Akita City Government created a rugby union team. The new Bullets team was formed in 2004, and allocated to the Top North League. As of 2017, the club is in the Top East Division 1,  the third-highest level of rugby competition in the country

Notable players and coaches
Joshua Kerevi
Clynton Knox
Manueli Nawalu
Temo Raibevu
Tiuana Takapu
Alaska Taufa
Setareki Tawake
Bryce Tevita
Tone Tukufuka
Sio Moceituba
Jacob Mackellar
Connor Wihongi
Mosese Sokiveta

Honors and titles
Top North League
Champions (2): 2004-05, 2005-06
Runners-up (3) 2001, 2002, 2003-04
National Sports Festival of Japan
Champions (1): 2007

Songs and chants

 City Anthem of Akita - Audio

Lyrics

References

External links

Official Site

Japanese rugby union teams
Sport in Akita (city)
Sports teams in Akita Prefecture
1958 establishments in Japan
Rugby clubs established in 1958